Donald McDonald (22 February 1887 — 29 June 1961) was an English first-class cricketer of Scottish descent.

McDonald was born in February 1887 at Chard, Somerset. He was educated at Taunton School, before matriculating to the University of Edinburgh. A club cricketer for Carlton, he was selected to play for the Scottish cricket team in a single first-class match against Ireland at Edinburgh in 1913. Playing as a slow left-arm orthodox bowler in the Scottish side, McDonald met with success in the Irish first-innings by taking figures of 5 for 51, in addition to taking the wicket of Bob Lambert. Batting twice in the match, he was dismissed for 6 runs in the Scottish first innings by Basil Ward, while in their second innings he was not required to bat. McDonald served in the First World War as a captain in the Somerset Light Infantry, with attachment to the 20th (Light) Division in 1918. McDonald died in June 1961 at Southbourne, Hampshire.

References

External links
 

1887 births
1961 deaths
English people of Scottish descent
People from Chard, Somerset
People educated at Taunton School
Alumni of the University of Edinburgh
English cricketers
Scotland cricketers
Somerset Light Infantry officers
British Army personnel of World War I